Waterville is a city in Lucas County, Ohio, United States, along the Maumee River, a suburb of Toledo. The population was 6,003 at the 2020 census.

Waterville is most well known on the Internet for being the production location for the gaming comedy review series Scott The Woz and the residence of its creator Scott Wozniak.

History
Waterville was platted in 1830 by settler John Pray on the west bank of the upper Maumee River opposite what was then known as Pray's Falls, a rapids on that stream. A post office called Waterville has been in operation since 1828.

Geography

The community is located on the Maumee River and was formerly on the Miami and Erie Canal route.

Demographics

2010 census
As of the census of 2010, there were 5,523 people, 2,065 households, and 1,566 families living in the village. The racial makeup of the city was 96.7% White, 0.5% African American, 0.1% Native American, 1.0% Asian, 0.6% from other races, and 1.2% from two or more races. Hispanic or Latino of any race were 2.7% of the population.

There were 2,065 households, of which 38.5% had children under the age of 18 living with them, 63.9% were married couples living together, 8.6% had a female householder with no husband present, 3.4% had a male householder with no wife present, and 24.2% were non-families. 20.5% of all households were made up of individuals, and 9.4% had someone living alone who was 65 years of age or older. The average household size was 2.62 and the average family size was 3.03.

The median age in the city was 41.6 years. 25.9% of residents were under the age of 18; 6.1% were between the ages of 18 and 24; 22.8% were from 25 to 44; 31.3% were from 45 to 64; and 13.9% were 65 years of age or older. The gender makeup of the village was 48.1% male and 51.9% female.

2000 census
As of the census of 2000, there were 4,828 people, 1,726 households, and 1,322 families living in the village. The population density was 1,378.7 people per square mile (532.6/km). There were 1,809 housing units at an average density of 516.6 per square mile (199.6/km). The racial makeup of the village was 97.91% White, 0.14% African American, 0.14% Native American, 0.35% Asian, 0.56% from other races, and 0.89% from two or more races. Hispanic or Latino of any race were 1.35% of the population.

There were 1,726 households, out of which 39.0% had children under the age of 18 living with them, 66.6% were married couples living together, 6.9% had a female householder with no husband present, and 23.4% were non-families. 19.8% of all households were made up of individuals, and 8.2% had someone living alone who was 65 years of age or older. The average household size was 2.70 and the average family size was 3.15.

In the village the population was spread out, with 28.1% under the age of 18, 5.8% from 18 to 24, 27.5% from 25 to 44, 25.3% from 45 to 64, and 13.3% who were 65 years of age or older. The median age was 39 years. For every 100 females, there were 92.7 males. For every 100 females age 18 and over, there were 89.3 males.

The median income for a household in the village was $60,000, and the median income for a family was $71,027. Males had a median income of $49,489 versus $31,638 for females. The per capita income for the village was $23,679. About 1.9% of families and 1.8% of the population were below the poverty line, including 1.4% of those under age 18 and 5.5% of those age 65 or over.

Arts and culture

Historic sites
The Interurban Bridge, also known as the Ohio Electric Railroad Bridge. is a historic interurban railroad bridge built in 1908 across the Maumee River joining Lucas and Wood counties near Waterville, Ohio. It is now located in Farnsworth Metropark. One of the bridge's supports is the Roche de Boeuf, a historic Indian council rock, which was partially destroyed by the bridge construction.
On June 19, 1972, it was added to the National Register of Historic Places. The bridge has been abandoned for several years.

Built in 1828, John Pray constructed a house to serve as a trading post, tavern and hostel located in Waterville, OH. It became the centerpiece of the village. The place where locals and travelers alike escaped from the harsh Summers and Winters. Constructed from black walnut beams, it quickly transformed into a third-story structure containing a prison cell (for transit prisoners), a dressmaker's shop and doctor. Like many historic buildings, this one switched hands many times over the years, becoming a restaurant between 1943 and 1993.

Parks and recreation
Baer Park has a playground, baseball field, basketball courts, tennis courts, shuffleboard area, and walking path.

Government
The City of Waterville is organized as a Strong Administrator form of government.  The City Administrator is the CEO of the Municipal Corporation, overseeing the day-to-day operations of the city.  The mayor (currently Timothy Pedro) and City Council members (currently Barb Bruno, Anthony Bruno, Rodney Frey, Mary Duncan, Todd Borowski, and John Rozic) serve part-time.

Education
Anthony Wayne School District administers public schools in the city.

Waterville has a public library, a branch of the Toledo-Lucas County Public Library.

Infrastructure
The city has a full-time police department and public works department. The fire department is staffed by a full-time fire chief and deputy chief, and is supported by a combination of part-time and volunteer fire fighters.

References

External links
 more Waterville, Ohio info from Toledo.com
 Maumee Valley Heritage Corridor, history of Waterville

Cities in Lucas County, Ohio
1830 establishments in Ohio
Populated places established in 1830
Cities in Ohio